Snowboard Kids 2 is a snowboarding video game developed by Racjin and published by Atlus. It is the sequel to Snowboard Kids and was itself followed by a sequel, SBK: Snowboard Kids.

Gameplay
Snowboard Kids 2 retains the core gameplay of its predecessor, while making changes to game mechanics.

The main game is separated in two modes. Story Mode unites the Battle Races and Skill Games from the previous installment. There are coins on the courses, except in Expert Mode. It also introduces recurring boss stages after a set number of races and a hub town that replaces the game menu. 

Four new characters are introduced and one is absent from the previous game, making for a total of nine characters. Only the six starter characters can be used in Story Mode, while all nine characters can be used in Battle Mode, provided that the remaining three are unlocked. The five returning characters are heavily redesigned, and every character now has a set of four costumes to fit in with the different themes of the races. The Normal Mode is the standard level for beginners, and Expert Mode is unlocked after beating the entire Story Mode.

The game features a total of fifteen courses. Like the previous game, the themes and terrain of the races are not restricted only to snow, now featuring a tropical island, a castle, a haunted house, and even space. Story Mode features the standard nine race courses, three Skill Game courses and three Boss Stages; these are modified versions of race courses with changes in the time of day, weather and/or course hazards. All of them can be played as race courses in Battle Mode. All courses now have a standard 3-lap count, which can be customized for Battle Mode.

Since the first game, the Shots were renamed Weapons. They changed the effects of these power ups. For instance, the slapstick has a new effect of making the opposing player to lose coins, the freeze time was reduced, and the frying pan now has a standard effect time.

Instead of using special tricks, players can now do multiple tricks in the air. The player can now block weapon attacks by performing a trick or board grab or pressing the R button to look behind.

Notes

References 

1999 video games
Atlus games
Nintendo 64 games
Nintendo 64-only games
Racjin games
Snowboarding video games
Video games developed in Japan